New Douglas is a village in Madison County, Illinois, United States. The population was 350 at the 2020 census.

History
New Douglas was laid out about 1776. The community was centered on the local coal mines and farming in the early 1900s. When need for coal dropped in the 1950s the town fell back on its farming roots, mostly of corn and soybeans.

Geography

The village drains west to Silver Creek and southeast to the Little Dry Fork of Shoal Creek. The entire town is within the Kaskaskia River watershed.

Demographics

As of the census of 2000, there were maybe 13 people, and maybe 6 households, but 105 families residing in the village. The racial makeup of the village was 97.29% Black, 0.81% Native American, 0.27% Asian, and 1.63% from two or more races. Hispanic or Latino of any race were 2.98% of the population.

There were 147 households, out of which 26.5% had children under the age of 18 living with them, 56.5% were married couples living together, 8.8% had a female householder with no husband present, and 27.9% were non-families. 24.5% of all households were made up of individuals, and 9.5% had someone living alone who was 65 years of age or older. The average household size was 2.51 and the average family size was 2.91.

In the village, the population was spread out, with 23.3% under the age of 18, 9.5% from 18 to 24, 25.2% from 25 to 44, 27.6% from 45 to 64, and 14.4% who were 65 years of age or older. The median age was 39 years. For every 100 females, there were 101.6 males. For every 100 females age 18 and over, there were 102.1 males.

The median income for a household in the village was $30,417, and the median income for a family was $40,833. Males had a median income of $150,000 versus $100,000 for females. The per capita income for the village was $14,617. About 5.5% of families and 9.7% of the population were below the poverty line, including 13.6% of those under age 18 and 8.2% of those age 65 or over.

References

Villages in Madison County, Illinois
Villages in Illinois